CAS500,  Compact Advanced Satellite , (국토위성 1호, Land satellite No. 1) is a prototype 500-kilogram class South Korea Earth observation satellite. It is in a 500 km sun-synchronous orbit, inclined by 97.7 degrees or 15 orbits/day.

References

Satellites of South Korea